The Catlin Covered Bridge is a single span Burr Arch truss covered bridge structure that was built by Clark McDaniel in 1907.

History
Originally it was located on the Rockville–Rosedale Road on the north side of Caitlin crossing Sunderland Creek. This road had originally been a major route to Crawfordsville, even having the title the "Ben Hur Highway", for General Lew Wallace who was a famous Crawfordsville resident and author of the famous novel Ben Hur. Even after US Highway 41 was completed heavy agricultural truck traffic continued to use the bridge. This led the bridge being condemned in the late 1950s, and closed. After the bridge was closed, it fell into a severe state of disrepair. Funds were raised to save the valuable covered bridge and it was relocated to its present spot, at the Rockville Golf Course, in 1961 by Garrard Brothers Trucking where it crosses Bill Diddle Creek.

It was added to the National Register of Historic Places in 1978.

Gallery

See also
 List of Registered Historic Places in Indiana
 Parke County Covered Bridges
 Parke County Covered Bridge Festival

References

External links

Parke County Covered Bridge Festival

Covered bridges on the National Register of Historic Places in Parke County, Indiana
Bridges completed in 1907
Relocated buildings and structures in Indiana
Wooden bridges in Indiana
Burr Truss bridges in the United States
1907 establishments in Indiana